Scott Amron (born January 15, 1980) is an American conceptual artist and electrical engineer.

Amron studied electrical and mechanical engineering in Europe and the United States, earning a B.E. in Electrical Engineering from Stony Brook University.  In 2007, he started Amron Experimental, his one-man design firm  and engineering atelier  known for selling original proof-of-concept prototypes as limited edition design-art. He has exhibited in London, the Netherlands, Germany, Singapore, and New York City. Amron's clients and stockists include OXO International, Polder, Whitney Museum of American Art, MoMA, NASA, and Target Corporation.

Amron is best known for his Brush & Rinse Toothbrush  (voted best concept of 2007 by I.D. Magazine), Die Electric OFF Switch, Endo Magnet, and Cash Money Clip.    His work has been praised for dismissing preconceived notions of how we are "supposed" to interact with basic objects. His experimental product designs promote sustainability and change perspectives.

Awards and recognitions
 2008 iF Material Award
 2007 I.D. Annual Design Review, Best Concept
 Netdiver Magazine Best of 2007
 2007 Red Dot Design Award
 Graphis Award (2) 2009

External links
Amron Experimental
Interview

References

Living people
1980 births
American industrial designers
Stony Brook University alumni